The Rock 'n' Roll New Orleans Marathon & 1/2 Marathon is an annual international road running marathon hosted by New Orleans, Louisiana, in the United States, since 1965.  It is part of the Rock 'n' Roll Marathon Series organized by Advance Publications' Ironman Group.

History 

On , the New Orleans Road Runners Club held the inaugural race, named "The New Orleans Marathon", on the Mississippi levee, from behind the zoo at Audubon Park to St. Rose and back.  The race saw 19 starters and 12 finishers, and was held with no aid stations.  Harry Belin, a Tulane University student, won the race in 2:47:30.

The marathon has been held annually since, except for 1968.

In the 1980s, a noted local participant was John Allen Dixon Jr., Chief Justice of the Louisiana Supreme Court, who won the race in the over-60 category several times.

The event was taken over by Competitor Group for the 2010 edition  and adopted the Rock 'n' Roll Series name after its takeover.

In 2010, the marathon was run as an open class or mass race while the half marathon formed the elite section of the event. The elite competition started strongly, with Martin Lel beating Samuel Wanjiru in the men's section while Berhane Adere and Kim Smith ran the fastest and third-fastest times ever on American soil, for first and second place respectively. A total of around 13,000 runners participated in the day's events.

In 2011, Kim Smith returned to set a 19-second personal best of 1:07:36, a new U.S. all-comer's record for the women's half marathon.

The 2021 edition of the race was cancelled due to the coronavirus pandemic.

Course 

The marathon starts on Poydras Street near Lafayette Square in the Central Business District and ends in City Park near Tad Gormley Stadium.

The course makes significant use of St. Charles Avenue, Decatur Street, Esplanade Avenue, Wisner Boulevard, and Lakeshore Drive along Lake Pontchartrain.

Winners 

Key: Course record (in bold)

Marathon

Half marathon

Notes

References

External links

Official website

Marathons in the United States
Road Running
Recurring sporting events established in 2010